The N'Goussa district is an Algerian administrative district in the Ouargla province.  Its chief town is located on the eponymous commune of N'Goussa.

Communes 
The district is composed of only one commune: N'Goussa.

References 

Districts of Ouargla Province